Lessach is a municipality in the district of Tamsweg in the state of Salzburg in Austria.

References

Cities and towns in Tamsweg District